Black Beauty is an 1877 novel by Anna Sewell.

Animals
 Black Beauty (horse) (born 1996), one-time world record holder for smallest living horse
 "Black Beauty", the nickname of RTMP 81.6.1, a well-preserved fossil of the theropod dinosaur Tyrannosaurus rex

Art, entertainment, and media

Adaptations of Sewell's novel 
 Black Beauty (1921 film), an American film directed by Edward H. Griffith
 Black Beauty (1933 film), an American film
 Black Beauty (1946 film), an American film starring Richard Denning
 Black Beauty (1971 film), starring Mark Lester as Joe Evans and directed by James Hill
 Black Beauty (1978 film), an animated film produced by Hanna-Barbera for broadcast on CBS 
 Black Beauty (1987 film), an Australian animated cartoon
 Black Beauty (1994 film), narrated by Alan Cumming
 Black Beauty (1995 film), an animated film produced by Jetlag Productions for direct-to-video release by GoodTimes Entertainment
 Black Beauty (2020 film)
 The Adventures of Black Beauty, a 1972–74 British television series that utilizes characters from the novel
 The New Adventures of Black Beauty, 1990–91, a sequel series to The Adventures of Black Beauty

Fictional vehicles
 Black Beauty, the Green Hornet's car

Music
 "Black Beauty" (1928 song), a jazz piano tune by Duke Ellington
 Black Beauty: Live at the Fillmore West, a live album recorded by Miles Davis in 1970
 Black Beauty (album), a 1973 album by Love
 "Black Beauty", song by Lana Del Rey from the deluxe edition of the album Ultraviolence

Musical instruments
 "Black Beauty", a nickname for the Gibson Les Paul Custom guitar made by the Gibson Guitar Corporation
 Black Beauty, a line of snare drums made by Ludwig-Musser

Plants
 Black beauty, a type of Black rose
 Black Beauty eggplant, a purple-skinned variety of eggplant
 Black Beauty, a muscadine (Vitis rotundifolia) cultivar

Other uses
 "Black Beauty", nickname of meteorite Northwest Africa 7034
 "Black Beauty", nickname of the car of A1 Team New Zealand
 Black Beauty, a Tyrannosaurus specimen at the Royal Tyrrell Museum of Palaeontology

See also
 Black is beautiful